The Haitian National Police (PNH) is the law enforcement and de facto police force of Haiti. It was created in 1995 to bring public security under civilian control as mandated in Haiti's constitution. More than 8,500 police officers have completed training.

The police force is divided into different divisions to tackle the many problems facing Haiti. Many of these divisions are specialised to address particular chronic crimes that affect the nation, including kidnapping, drugs and gangs. The force also has a Coast Guard and paramilitary units. The United Nations Stabilization Mission in Haiti has implemented a series of plans to increase the size of the police force to 14,000.

History
Under Jean-Claude Duvalier, the Haitian Police was part of the Haitian Army from 1912 and had 14,000 members divided between the blue-uniformed Port-au-Prince Police and the Rural Security Companies. Since 1987, successive governments attempted to reform the national police as stated by the constitution it was created to maintain peace, enforce law and order in accordance with the rule of law, to protect its citizens and to arrest those that violate the law. However the police, being plagued by militarism, factionalism, and corruption, is mainly viewed by citizens as being repressive.

The 1987 Constitution proposed the establishment of a separate police corps and a new police academy under the jurisdiction of the Ministry of Justice. Political developments in Haiti since 1987, however, have precluded implementation of these changes. Nevertheless, the mission of the police corps was almost indistinguishable from the mission spelled out for the FAd'H. The characterization of the police as a corps armée (armed corps) reinforced this similarity in missions.

The only identifiable police force in Haiti operated in Port-au-Prince as part of the armed forces. This 1,000-member force had few operational or technical capabilities, even though it was responsible for narcotics and immigration control and criminal investigations. In the late 1980s, the Narcotics Bureau, commanded by an army major, had acquired some visibility and resources of its own, with a reported staff of about twenty-five people.

There was no true rural police. Small garrisons, operating under military department command, with some cooperation from the lowest central government administrative head, section chief (chef de section), were responsible for rural security. In effect, the heads of these 562 rural communal sections (sections rurales communales) functioned as police chiefs, as adjuncts of the nation's military infrastructure. This fusion of civil and military administration continued to be possible because of the broad range of responsibilities assigned to the Ministry of Interior and National Defense.

After 1986 the armed forces failed to reestablish a nationwide police force and to subdue the MVSN and other vigilante groups. Some observers have argued that links between the senior army command and remnants of the MVSN have paralyzed reforms in Haiti's judicial system. An illustration of their point was the reported incorporation of some MVSN personnel into FAd'H units and some members of the VSN, as plainclothes paramilitary agents, in the Dessalines Battalion. Other MVSN members found their way into cadres of the Port-au-Prince police force, particularly in the Criminal Investigation Unit (Recheraches Criminelles—renamed in 1988 the Anti-Gang Investigations Bureau), which was traditionally based at the Dessalines barracks. The demise of the Dessalines Battalion and the Leopards, the latter of which had served as Haiti's special weapons and tactics unit, raised questions in the spring of 1989 about the future of a national police force.

The Avril government reported some success in cracking down on abuses within the security services, but violence continued to be a serious problem. Insecurity rose dramatically after 1986 with the formation of ad hoc paramilitary groups that had direct links to the VSN and indirect links to the military. Many of these paramilitary groups engaged in banditry with no political motivation. The security situation in rural regions and at the section chief level remained unclear in 1989.

The human-rights record of post-Duvalier governments was generally negative. A major problem was the inability, or the unwillingness, of the FAd'H to contain domestic political violence. Government and military personnel apparently sanctioned and participated in attacks on politicians and other activists, particularly during the second Namphy government. The Avril government boasted an improved record in this area, but as of mid-1989, it had proved incapable of restoring order.

Haitian military and police often brutally interrogated detainees. Rural section chiefs, who wielded considerable power within their limited jurisdictions, arbitrarily harassed and physically abused citizens, according to some reports. In an effort to address this problem, Avril dismissed a number of section chiefs, and issued a decree in December 1988 that ended appointments of section chiefs and proposed putting the posts up for election (see Urban Dominance, Rural Stagnation, ch. 9).

Harsh conditions prevailed in the prison system. Hygiene, food, and health care were inadequate, and prison staff regularly mistreated inmates. The Avril government closed two facilities closely associated with the repression of the Duvalier regimes— Fort Dimanche and the detention center of the Criminal Investigation Unit, both in Port-au-Prince—because of the abuses that had commonly taken place there.

Political turmoil between 1986 and 1989 resulted in popular justice and mob violence. The international media reported on some of this violence and featured scenes of burning or dismembered bodies. Continued human-rights violations are likely to attract international criticism during the 1990s. Lasting improvements in internal security, however, appeared unlikely without the establishment of functional civilian institutions and some resolution of the status of the former members of the tonton makouts. 
 
In 1995, Haiti disbanded its military, which formerly provided police services in rural areas and operated the Port-au-Prince Police.

During President Aristide's second term (2000−04) political appointees took over many key positions in the PNH. In many instances, these appointees lacked security experience and compromised the political neutrality of the force. After Aristide fled the country, the interim president removed 200 corrupt and inexperienced officers in an effort to improve the PNH's effectiveness. New training ensued to teach police officers how to balance security and human rights concerns. However, numerous problems limit the PNH's effectiveness and reliability. Former military personnel exert considerable influence within the police force, and some have begun to push for the reestablishment of the Haitian army.

Since its inception, the PNH has suffered from mismanagement, corruption, and a lack of funding. MINUSTAH has helped make up for the shortfalls of the PNH since it arrived in Haiti in 2004. Many security operations have been undertaken jointly by the PNH and MINUSTAH. Nevertheless, rampant crime and gang violence continue to be the most immediate problem facing Haitian authorities.

General Organization
The PNH is currently headed by the Director General (chief of police) Normil Rameau appointed by president Jovenel to a three-year term.

Although officially part of the police force, the Presidential Security Unit operates with its own budget and administration.

National Organization
The National organization of the PNH is as follows:

 Direction Générale de la Police Nationale d’Haiti or DGPNH (General Directorate of the National Police of Haiti)
 Inspection Générale de la Police Nationale d’Haiti or IGPNH  (Inspector General of the National Police of Haiti)
 Direction des Renseignements Généraux or DRG (Direction of the General Information)
 Cabinet Du directeur Général de la Police Nationale d’Haiti - CAB ( Cabinet of the Director General of the National Police of Haiti)
 Direction du Développement Ou Commissariat au Plan or DDCP (Direction of the Development or Planning Commission)

Centrally controlled organizations

General and Administrative Services
Direction Centrale de l’Administration et des Services Généraux or DCASG (Central Directorate of the Administration and General Services) is responsible for human resources, the finances, and logistics needs of the National Police of Haiti It includes the following components:

 La Direction des Finances et de la Comptabilité (DFC) - The Directorate of Finance and Accounting
 La Direction du Personnel (DP) - The Directorate of Personnel
 La Direction de la Logistique (DL) - The Directorate of Logistics
 La Direction des Ecoles et de la Formation Permanente (DEFP) - The Directorate of Schools and Continuing Education
 L'Administration Pénitentiaire Nationale (APENA) The National Penitentiary Administration

Administrative Police
Direction Centrale de la Police Administrative or DCPA (Central Directorate of the Administrative Police force) Under Article 28 of the Act establishing and organizing the National Police, the Central Directorate of Administrative Police (DCPA) is the body responsible for designing and implementing measures to safeguard the peace, tranquility and good public order. Administrative Police objectives are: to observe laws and regulations, prevent the commission of crimes and offenses against the established order, maintain order and restore where appropriate, the DCPA is thus to design and make implement measures to:
 Ensure public safety, protecting people, property and state institutions.
 Ensure the safeguarding of peace, tranquility and good public order throughout the national territory.
 Ensure law enforcement and in rehabilitation where appropriate.
 Channel, coordinate and supervise the operation mode of decentralized territorial commissions across the country.
 Provide ongoing and in coordination with other relevant departments needs reinforcement in certain districts of the country's sociopolitical life.
 Maintain a national registry of detention and request authorization to carry firearms.

Administrative Police directorates:

 La Direction de la Circulation et de la Police Routière (DCPR) - The Traffic and the Highway Police Directorate
 La Direction de la Protection Civile et des Secours (DPCS) - The Civil Defense and Rescue Directorate
 La Direction de la Sécurité Publique et du Maintien de l’Ordre (DSPMO)- The Public Security and Maintenance of Order Directorate
 La Direction des Services Territoriaux (DST) - Territorial Services Directorate
 La Direction de la Police de Mer, de l’Air, des Frontières, de la migration et des Forêts. (DPM-A-Ff-Mi-Fo) The Water, Air, and Border Police Directorate

Administrative police special units are:
 Le Corps d'Intervention et de Maintien de l'Ordre (CIMO) - Intervention and Maintenance of Order Corps (Riot Police)
 Le Groupe d'Intervention de la Police Nationale d'Haïti (GIPNH) - National Police Intervention Group, the national SWAT team.
 L'Unité de Sécurité Générale du Palais National (USGPN) - The General Security Unit of the National Palace (USGPN)
 Le Corps des Sapeurs-Pompiers et de Police-Secours (CSP-PS)- The Fire Brigade and Emergency Police
 L'Unité de Sécurité de la Direction Générale (USDG) - The Security Unit of the Directorate General (USDG)
 L'Unité de la Sécurité du Conseil Electoral Provisoire - The  Security Unit of  Provisional Electoral Counsel
 L'Unité de la Sécurité Judiciaire (USJ)- Unit of the Judicial Security
 L'Unité de Sécurité Diplomatique (USD) - The Diplomatic Security Unit
 Le Commissariat de l'Aéroport (CA) - The Airport Commission
 Le Commissariat de Malpasse (CM) - The Commissioner of Malpasse
 Le Commissariat des Garde-Côtes (CGC) - The commission for the Coast Guard
 Le Service de permis de port d'armes à feu (SPPAF) - The Permits to Carry Firearms Service
 L'Unité de Sécurité de l'INARA, chargée de sécuriser le programme de la réforme agraire - INARA Unit Security responsible for securing of the Land Reform Program
 L'Unité de Sécurité et de Garde Présidentielle (USP), chargée de la protection du Chef de l'Etat - The Security Unit and Presidential Guard (USP), responsible for the protection of the President of Haiti
 Le Service National de Lutte Contre Incendie (SNI), chargé de combattre les incendies - The National Service to Control Against Fire (NIS), responsible for fighting fires
 La Police de l'air, chargée de surveiller les frontières aériennes; (PA) - Police to patrol air, to monitor air borders;

Judicial Police
Direction Centrale de la Police Judiciaire or DCPJ (Central Directorate of the Judicial police) is the Detective service of the Haitian Police. It has six (6) offices in thirty sections or services, and two hundred sixty nine staff. It is located in the Clercine neighborhood at an extension of the Terminal Guy Malary and is housed in a thousand square meter building. All DCPJ units are housed together since September 2005, with the exception of Police Science and Technology Center. Previously the DCPJ shared the room with the Departmental Direction of the West is moved over two years towards the city center.

The Central Directorate of Judicial Police's mission is to find the perpetrators of crimes, gather evidence and clues in order to bring them in front their natural judge within the time fixed by law. It fulfills its role primarily in the field of serious organized crime. It is also responsible for combating transnational crime in cooperation with Interpol.

Furthermore, the diverse nature of crimes and criminals easy to change their method and procedure necessary to impose the DCPJ duty to dispose of bodies specialized in the fight against organized crime to carry out its mission.

The Police Judiciaire includes the following services:

 Le Bureau des Affaires Criminelles (BAC) - The Criminal Affairs Bureau
 La Brigade de Recherche et d’Intervention (BRI) - The Research and Intervention Brigade
 Le Bureau de Renseignements Judiciaires (BRJ) - The Judicial Information Bureau
 La Brigade de Protection des Mineurs (BPM) - The Protection of Minors Brigade
 La Brigade de Lutte contre le Trafic de Stupéfiants (BLTS) - The Controlling of Narcotics Trafficking Brigade
 Le Bureau de la Police Scientifique et Technique (BPST) - The Police Scientific and Technical Bureau
 Le Bureau des Affaires Financières et Economiques (BAFE) - The Financial and Economic Affairs Braigade
 La Cellule Contre Enlèvement (CCE) - Anti-Kidnapping Cell

Regional Organization
These are the Police forces for the Departments of Haiti. The departments are further divided into 41 arrondissement offices, and 133 communal offices.

 Direction Département de L’Ouest or DDO (Direction Department of the West)
 Direction Département de L’Artibonite or DDA (Direction Department of Artibonite)
 Direction Département du Nord-Est or DDNE (Direction Department of the North-East)
 Direction Département du Nord or DDN (Direction Department of North)
 Direction Département du Sud-Est or DDSE (Direction Department of the South East)
 Direction Département du Nord-Ouest or DDNO (Direction Department of the North-West)
 Direction Département du Centre or DDC (Direction Department of the center)
 Direction Département de La Grande-Anse or DDGA (Direction Department of the South-West)
 Direction Département du Sud or DDS (Direction Department of the South)
 Direction Département des Nippes or DDnippes (Direction Department of Nippes)

Paramilitary units
The Haitian National Police maintains several paramilitary units for defense of the state.

Coast Guard

The Haitian National Police has a Coast Guard. It currently has twelve vedettes and seven Go-fast patrol boats. Its main functions are law enforcement and surveillance of Haitian waters.

Recruitment
The creation, training and deployment of the first contingents of the PNH, as a new police force separate from the Haitian Army, had raised difficult issues for decisions on the integration of former military officers experienced in Police Affairs in the ranks of the new National Police of Haiti, since it was important not to import the abusive practices that have made the reputation of some former members of the Armed Forces of Haiti. In addition, attention to executive reward Haitian militancy of its supporters by awarding positions in public administration, including the PNH, had greatly influenced the recruitment of new Haitian officers.

The personal allegiance required of new graduates of the academy and the police school by the Head of State made training and effective monitoring of the members of the police force difficult. This resulted in an officer cadre whose training and ethics are inadequate, and that a significant fraction is related to human rights abuses, drug trafficking, illicit enrichment, and most vicious crimes, including the latest fashion is to say the kidnapping of peaceful and honest citizens, as well as their wives and their children.

In recruiting members, including the transfer or promotion of any member to a new assignment, the PNH will:

 Using the constitutional provisions, laws of the Republic and its internal rules to reject any interference from political authorities in the efficient functioning of the police institution, especially as regards the management of its human resources;
 Using modern means of communication, including media, to inform the population, in the most comprehensive and transparent on its recruitment goals and general employment opportunities, in order to equalize the chances of participation of any individual qualified;
 Strengthen the process of selection of all candidates for a career in the police institution, both pre-requisite personnel, supporting documentation required, as written examinations, medical, physical and psychological, including a further verification of the personal history of candidates, particularly in relation to their performance in previous jobs, general crime, abuse of human rights and domestic violence;
 Apply a uniform and consistent testing, standards and regulations relating to recruitment;
 Train managers and other employees of the institution to an efficient, impartial and professional staff recruitment;
 Seek foreign assistance, as needed, to strengthen the management capacity of the recruitment process, particularly as related to verification of the candidate's personal history, skills and psychological profile of candidates.

Strength
As of early 2012, the police force is composed of 10,700 police officers, and also employs 2,500 support staff. The UN hopes to increase those numbers to 12,000 in 2012.  According to a report by U.N. Secretary General Ban Ki-moon, between 2012 and 2013, Haiti saw a 21 percent drop in homicides—reversing a five-year trend.  There was a plummet of kidnappings by 53 percent. During this time frame, the force increased to 11,228.

Vehicles
Dodge Ram
Lenco Bearcat
Terrier LT-79
Toyota Hilux
Nissan Frontier
Fiat Siena

Weapons
 IMI Galil
 R4 assault rifle
 M16 rifle
 Heckler & Koch G3
 FN MAG
 M1918 Browning Automatic Rifle
 T65 assault rifle
 M1911 pistol
 M1919 Browning machine gun
 Uzi
 M60 machine gun
 M4 carbine
 Benelli M4
 M14 rifle

Haitian Police Academy
At the Police Academy, it is important to modernize the curriculum and management training programs, and to strengthen the capacity of Haitian management. In Haiti, the pressing need for police personnel had helped train more than 5,000 police officers in six months as part of a training program administered mainly by international donors. The Haitian Police Academy is under the control of the Police Nationale d'Haiti, which appoints the director with the approval of the Supreme Council of the National Police (CSPN).

Formed in 1994, the academy hosted its first director in May 1995, and was to transfer responsibility for the training of national police from 1998 under the supervision of instructors Haitians instead of foreign instructors ICITAP. In 2006, the presence of a large contingent of foreign police within the mission of the MINUSTAH and UN civilian police, is an opportunity for capacity building Haitian, development of curriculum, the 'teaching and administration of the National Police Academy. The specific objectives of reform include:

 Strengthening the basic training curriculum to a standard equivalent to the best standards and practices;
 Increased international cooperation in matters of curriculum development for basic training, and teaching practice;
 The overhaul of the structure and administrative practices of the National Academy of Police, to parity with international institutions like best.

In 2022, the Head of the Haitian Police Academy, Harington Rigaud, was shot at the doors of the police training facility in the country's capital of Port-au-Prince.

See also 

 Law enforcement in Haiti

References

 Adrian J English, Armed Forces of Latin America

External links
 Official website
 Canadian Embassy article
 FAS weapons invantory 

National Police
National Police
Government agencies established in 1995
National police forces